The Embassy of Cyprus in Washington, D.C. is the  Republic of Cyprus's diplomatic mission to the United States. It is located at 2211 R Street N.W. in Washington, D.C.'s Kalorama neighborhood. 

The Ambassador is Marios Lyssiotis, who is concurrently the non-resident ambassador to the nation of Barbados.

Building
The building, a combination of Tudorbethan and Jacobean architecture, is a contributing property to the Sheridan-Kalorama Historic District and valued at $5,273,190.

References

External links

Official website

Cyprus
Washington, D.C.
Sheridan-Kalorama Historic District
Historic district contributing properties in Washington, D.C.
Cyprus–United States relations